Pertisau is a small village on the Achensee Lake in the Tyrol region of Austria.

Pertisau is in the Schwaz (district).  It is located in the Karwendel Alpine Park, one of the oldest, cross-border, protected areas of the Eastern Alps.

The town was used by English school story writer Elinor M. Brent-Dyer as the first setting for her Chalet School series, under the fictionalised name of Briesau am Tiernsee; a plaque on the wall of the village bookshop commemorates her writings.

Pertisau is also the center for the Achensee shipping business.  Ships start their journey along the lake from Pertisau and connect the villages around the lake with the Achenseebahn rack and pinion railway at Seespitz Station.

The village produces Tirolean mineral oil, an all-purpose tonic with a 100-year-old tradition of Tiroler Steinöl.

The parish church is the work of the Austrian architect Clemens Holzmeister.  Pertisau is also the location of the Fürstenhaus, a country residence of Emperor Maximilian I of Austria.

Above the town are two main winter ski areas, the Planberg Wiesenlifte, which has one easy trail, and the Karwendel Bergbahn, which has eight easy and eight intermediate trails.  The town also has paragliding, kite-surfing, mountain biking, rafting, and diving, hiking, sailing, and cycling activities.

References

External links
 Pertisau Information Bureau
 Pertisau Pictures

Cities and towns in Schwaz District